Leonard John King (born 31 July 1941) was an Australian Test cricket umpire from Victoria.

He umpired 6 Test matches between 1989 and 1993. His first match was between Australia and the West Indies at Sydney on 26 January to 30 January 1989, won by Australia by 7 wickets, with David Boon scoring a century and Allan Border a career-best 11 wickets and 75 runs, "an all-round performance seldom surpassed in Test cricket," according to Wisden. King’s partner was Terry Prue.

King’s last Test match was also between Australia and the West Indies at Adelaide on 23 January to 26 January 1993, a fluctuating match won by the visitors by a mere one run when Australia’s No. 11, Craig McDermott, was dismissed after a 40-run partnership with Tim May had brought Australia so close to victory. May and Merv Hughes both took 5 wickets in an innings. King's colleague was Darrell Hair.

King umpired 23 One Day International (ODI) matches between 1988 and 1993. In 1988 he umpired a women’s ODI match. Altogether, he umpired 41 first-class matches in his career between 1984 and 1994.

See also
 List of Test cricket umpires
 List of One Day International cricket umpires

References

External links
 
 

1941 births
Living people
Australian Test cricket umpires
Australian One Day International cricket umpires